Mary Francis Shura Craig, née Young (23 February 1923 in Pratt, Kansas – 12 January 1991 in Maywood, Illinois) was an American writer of over 50 novels from 1960 to 1990. She wrote children's adventures and young adult romances as Mary Francis Shura, M. F. Craig, and Meredith Hill; gothic novels as Mary Craig; romance novels as Alexis Hill, Mary Shura Craig and Mary S. Craig; and suspense novels as M. S. Craig.

She was a recipient of the Carl Sandburg Literary Arts Award in 1985, and was elected president of the Mystery Writers of America in 1990.

Biography 
Mary Francis Young was born on 23 February 1923 in Pratt, Kansas, the daughter of Jackson Fant and Mary Francis (Milstead) Young. She studied at Maryville State College. Her family moved to the Pacific Northwest. On 24 October 1943, she married Daniel Charles Shura, who died in 1959. They had three children: Marianne Francis Shura (Sprague), Daniel Charles Shura, and Alice Barrett Shura Craig (Stout). On 8 December 1961, she married Raymond C. Craig. They had a daughter Mary Forshay Craig (Shay Craig) before their divorce.

On 12 January 1991, she died of injuries suffered in a fire in her apartment on 13 December 1990.

Bibliography 
Some of her novels were republished under different titles

As Mary Francis Shura

Children's literature

Single novels 
Simple Spigott (1960); Publisher: New York, Alferd A. Knopf.
The garret of Greta McGraw (1961); Publisher: New York, Knopf.
Mary's marvelous mouse (1962); Adrienne Adams; Publisher: New York, Knopf.
The nearsighted knight (1964); Publisher: New York, Knopf.
Shoefull of shamrock (1965); Publisher: New York : Atheneum.
Run away home (1965)
A tale of middle length (1966); Publisher: New York, Atheneum.
Backwards for luck (1966)
Pornada (1968)
The valley of the frost giants (1971)
The seven stone (1972) aka Maggie in the middle; Dale Payson; Publisher: New York : Scholastic Book Services.
The shop on Threnody Street (1972)
Topcat of Tam (1972) aka Top Cat
The riddle of Raven's Gulch (1975) aka The riddle of Raven Hollow; Publisher: New York : Dodd, Mead.
The season of silence (1976); Ruth Sanderson; Publisher: New York : Atheneum.
The gray ghosts of Taylor Ridge (1978); Michael A Hampshire; Publisher: New York : Dodd, Mead.
The Barkley Street six-pack (1979) aka My Friend Natalie aka Some Kind of Friend; Gene Sparkman; Publisher: New York : Dodd, Mead.
Mister Wolf and me (1979); Konrad Hack; Publisher: New York : Dodd, Mead
Happles and cinnamonger (1981); Bertram M Tormey; Publisher: New York : Dodd, Mead.
The search for Grissi (1985); Ted Lewin; Publisher: New York, N.Y. : Dodd, Mead.
Tales from Dickens (1985)
The Josie gambit (1986); Publisher: New York : Dodd, Mead.
Don't call me Toad! (1987); Jacqueline Rogers; Publisher: New York : Dodd, Mead.
The Sunday doll (1988); Ted Lewin; Publisher: New York : Dodd, Mead.
The mystery at Wolf River (1989); Publisher: New York, N.Y. : Scholastic.
Kate's book (1989); Publisher: New York : Scholastic.
Kate's house (1990); Publisher: New York : Scholastic.
Polly panic (1990); Publisher: New York : Putnam, 1990.
Gentle Annie : the true story of a Civil War nurse (1991); Publisher: New York : Scholastic.
Our teacher is missing (1992); Publisher: New York : Scholastic.

Kids of the Neighborhood series 
Chester the great (1980) aka Chester; Susan Swan; Publisher: New York : Dodd, Mead.
Eleanor (1983); Susan Swan; Publisher: New York : Dodd, Mead.
Jefferson (1984); Susan Swan; Publisher: New York : Dodd, Mead.

Young adult romances

Sunfire 
Jessica (1984); Publisher: New York : Scholastic Inc.
Marilee (1984); Publisher: New York : Scholastic.
Marilee (1987); Publisher: New York : Scholastic.
Diana (1988): Publisher: New York : Scholastic.
Darcy (1989); Publisher: New York : Scholastic.

Other novels 
Winter dreams, Christmas love (1992); Publisher: New York : Scholastic.
Summer dreams, winter love (1993); Publisher: London : Scholastic.

As Mary Craig

Gothic novels 
A Candle for the Dragon (1973)
Ten Thousand Several Doors (1973) aka Mistress of Lost River
The Cranes of Ibycus (1974) aka Shadows of the Past
Were He a Stranger (1978)

As Alexis Hill

Riviere Saga (romance) 
Passion's Slave (1979)
The Untamed Heart (1980)

As M. S. Craig

Romance novels 
Dust to Diamonds: The Chicagoans (1981)

Suspense novels 
To play the fox (1982); Publisher: New York : Dodd, Mead.
Gillian's chain  (1983); Publisher: New York : Dodd, Mead.
The third blonde (1985); Publisher: New York : Dodd, Mead.
Flash point (1987); Publisher: New York, N.Y. : Dodd, Mead.

As Mary Shura Craig

Romance novels 
Lyon's Pride (1983)
Pirate's Landing (1983)
Fortune's Destiny (1986)

As Meredith Hill

Young adult romances

Individual novels 
The Silent Witness (1983)

Chrystal Falls series 
1. The Wrong Side of Love (1986)
5. A Loss of Innocence (1986)
6. Forbidden Love (1986)

As M. F. Craig

Children's literature 
The Mystery at Peacock Place (1986)

As Mary S. Craig

Romance novels 
Dark Paradise (1986)

References and sources

External links 
Guide to the Mary Francis Craig papers at the University of Oregon.

1923 births
1991 deaths
20th-century American novelists
American children's writers
American mystery writers
American romantic fiction writers
American women novelists
People from Pratt, Kansas
Writers from Kansas
American women children's writers
Women romantic fiction writers
Women mystery writers
20th-century American women writers
Pseudonymous women writers
20th-century pseudonymous writers